Zeuxine longilabris is a terrestrial orchid species belonging to the family Orchidaceae. It is seen across Indo-Malesia. It is a slender, small sized plant with lower creeping stem and an erect part growing up to 25cm. Flowers are white with coarsely toothed petals. Flowering season is late fall to early winter.

References 

Flora of Malesia
longilabris